Khvod Rahi (also Romanized as Khvod Rāhī and Khowd Rāhī; also known as Khod Rāhī) is a village in Ravar Rural District, in the Central District of Ravar County, Kerman Province, Iran. At the 2006 census, its population was 81, in 23 families.

References 

Populated places in Ravar County